The 2012 Summit League men's basketball tournament was the 2012 post-season tournament for The Summit League, an NCAA Division I athletic conference. The tournament took place March 3–6, 2012, at the Sioux Falls Arena in Sioux Falls, South Dakota.  South Dakota State won and received an automatic bid to the 2012 NCAA tournament.

This was the final Summit League tournament for Southern Utah, which joined the Big Sky Conference for the 2012–13 basketball season. Meanwhile, Oral Roberts joined the Southland Conference in 2012–13 but returned to the Summit in 2014–15.

Format
Out of the league's 10 teams, the top eight in the standings qualified for the conference tournament. Teams were seeded by conference record, with the following tiebreakers used if necessary: 

 Head-to-head competition
 Comparison of each tied team's record against the team occupying the highest position in the standings continuing down through the standings until a team gains an advantage. 
 When arriving at another group of tied teams while comparing records, use each team's record against the collective tied teams as a group (prior to that group's own tie-breaking procedure) rather than the performance against individual tied teams.
 If a tie still cannot be broken after applying criteria (1), (2) and (3), it will be broken by comparing each tied team's RPI (based upon the RPIRankings.com Report issued on the morning following the last regular season league game).

The following criteria were applied to break ties between more than two teams:
 Head-to-head
 Each tied team's record shall be compared to the team or group (if two or more are tied) occupying the highest position in the standings continuing down through the standings until a team gains an advantage.

Bracket

References

Tournament
Summit League men's basketball tournament
The Summit League men's basketball tournament
Basketball competitions in Sioux Falls, South Dakota
College basketball tournaments in South Dakota